Beauchamp Roding is a village in the civil parish of Abbess, Beauchamp and Berners Roding, and in the Epping Forest District of Essex, England. The village is included in the eight hamlets and villages called The Rodings.

History
According to A Dictionary of British Place Names, Roding derives from "Rodinges" as is listed in the Domesday Book, with the later variation 'Royenges Beauchamp' recorded in 1238. The 'Beauchamp' refers to the manorial possession by a family called 'de Beauchamp' held under the ownership of the Abbess of Barking.

In the Domesday account Beauchamp Roding is listed as in the Hundred of Ongar. It held 15 households, two villagers, 13 smallholders,  of meadow and 200 pigs. Before the Conquest, lordship was held by Edsi and Leofwin; after given to Aubrey de Vere, with Count Alan of Brittany as Tenant-in-chief to William the Conqueror.

Other traditional names for the village and manor included 'Beauchamp Roothing' and 'Roding Beauchamp'. It was in the Hundred of Ongar. In 1882 it was also in the Ongar Union—poor relief provision set up under the Poor Law Amendment Act 1834 —and part of the Rural Deanery of Ongar. The registers of the church of St Botolph date to 1688. The church, which was restored in 1867, had attached an 1882 living of a rectory with residence for the priest. There was also a parish school. The area in and around the village had one principal landowner. The hamlet of Birds Green in the parish to the south of the village was partly in the parish of Willingale Doe. Crops grown at the time were chiefly wheat, barley and beans, on a heavy soil with a clay subsoil. There was a land area of  supporting an 1881 population of 231. Occupations included a beer retailer, a farm bailiff, five farmers, one of whom was a hay dealer and the licensee of the Swan Inn public house, and another farming at Butt Hatch. Also at Butt Hatch was a shopkeeper.

Since 1946, Beauchamp Roding has been part of the Abbess, Beauchamp and Berners Roding civil parish.

References

External links
 
 Abbess, Beauchamp and Berners Roding Parish Council official website including Beauchamp Roding description. Retrieved 10 February 2018

Villages in Essex
Former civil parishes in Essex
Epping Forest District